Cooper v. Oklahoma, 517 U.S. 348 (1996), was a United States Supreme Court case in which the Court reversed an Oklahoma court decision holding that a defendant is presumed to be competent to stand trial unless he proves otherwise by the second highest legal standard of proof, that of clear and convincing evidence, ruling that to be unconstitutional. The court said the defendant's Fourteenth Amendment rights to due process were violated.

In this case, the defendant's ability to understand the charges against him and his ability to assist in his own defense was challenged on five separate occasions before and during his trial and sentencing for capital murder, but the trial judge ruled he was competent to stand trial because he did not meet Oklahoma's high standard of proof.

Circumstances
Byron Keith Cooper was charged in 1989 with the murder of an 86-year-old man while in the course of committing burglary. Both before and during his trial, the question of his competency to stand trial was raised five times. The first time the question arose, the trial judge relied on the opinion of a state psychologist in determining to commit the defendant to a state psychiatric hospital for three months of treatment. Upon Cooper's return, the trial judge heard testimony from two state psychologists regarding Cooper's competence, but as these experts disagreed over whether Cooper was competent to stand trial, the judge decided to rule against Cooper and ordered the trial to proceed. After the pretrial hearing was completed, the defense attorney raised the issue of Cooper's competence a third time, telling the court that Cooper's behavior was "odd" and that he refused to communicate with his attorney. The attorney said that it could be a serious matter "if he's not faking".  However, the judge declined to review his earlier decision that Cooper was competent to proceed.

On the first day of trial, Cooper's bizarre behavior (such as fleeing from his defense attorney, refusing to change his prison clothes because regular clothes "burned" him, and talking to himself while in the fetal position) induced the court to conduct a further competency hearing. This time the trial judge observed Cooper and heard testimony from people including lay witnesses, defendant Cooper, and a third psychologist who concluded that Cooper was incompetent. While expressing his uncertainty and not disagreeing with the psychologist, the judge ruled against Cooper and ordered the trial to proceed, finally opining:

The trial proceeded with Cooper continuing to act in a bizarre manner and refusing to be near his attorney. Cooper was convicted of first degree murder, and during the sentencing phase of the trial the history of Cooper's childhood abuse was recounted. Finally the defense attorney pleaded for either a mistrial or further evaluation into Cooper's competence, describing Cooper's courtroom behavior:

The court summarily denied the motion. Cooper received the death penalty after the jury recommended death.

Cooper appealed, and the Oklahoma Court of Criminal Appeals affirmed both the conviction and the sentence. Cooper appealed to the Supreme Court on a writ of certiorari.

Decision
In a unanimous verdict, the Supreme Court reversed the judgment and remanded the case back to  the Oklahoma Court of Criminal Appeals for further consideration in light of their opinion. The Court held that the State may not proceed with a criminal trial when the defendant has demonstrated that he is more likely than not to be incompetent. Requiring a higher standard of proof, that of "clear and convincing evidence", was too high a standard of proof for a defendant to demonstrate a need for a competency evaluation, increasing the possibility of error to a level "incompatible with the dictates of due process". Criminal defendants must be allowed to avoid trial if they prove incompetence by a "preponderance of the evidence."

The court used the relevant history of common law regarding competency and the treatment of the insane and also compared Oklahoma's standards with the contemporary practices  of other states, finding that only 4 of the 50 states used Oklahoma's heightened standard of proof. They concluded that this "demonstrates that the vast majority of jurisdictions remain persuaded that the heightened standard of proof imposed on the accused in Oklahoma is not necessary to vindicate the State's interest in prompt and orderly disposition of criminal cases." The court found most states uses a burden of proof far lower, or imposed no burden of proof at all, once the competency question is raised.

Significance
The American Academy for Psychiatry and the Law unofficially considers this decision a landmark case in competency to stand trial case law. The court stated that no one questions the fundamental right of competency to stand trial. As established in Dusky v. United States, a defendant has a fundamental right not to be put to trial unless he has "sufficient present ability to consult with his lawyer with a reasonable degree of rational understanding  . . . [and] a rational as well as factual understanding of the proceedings against him." A State may not proceed with a criminal trial after the defendant has demonstrated that he is more likely than not to be incompetent.

See also
 List of United States Supreme Court cases, volume 517
 List of United States Supreme Court cases
 Lists of United States Supreme Court cases by volume
 List of United States Supreme Court cases by the Rehnquist Court
Drope v. Missouri (1975) 
Ford v. Wainwright (1986)

Footnotes

External links
 
Oklahoma Uniform Jury Instructions regarding competency decisions
Retarded Defendants Gain More Protection - New York Times article on Cooper v. Oklahoma

Mental health law in the United States
United States Supreme Court cases
United States Supreme Court cases of the Rehnquist Court
1996 in United States case law
United States Fourteenth Amendment case law